Andrea Sestini Hlaváčková and Barbora Strýcová were the defending champions, but Sestini Hlaváčková did not participate due to maternity leave. Strýcová played alongside Hsieh Su-wei, but lost in the second round to Jeļena Ostapenko and Dayana Yastremska.

Sofia Kenin and Bethanie Mattek-Sands won the title, defeating Ostapenko and Yastremska in the final, 6–3, 6–7(5–7), [10–7].

Kristina Mladenovic regained the WTA no. 1 doubles ranking from Strýcova after the end of the tournament. Elise Mertens was also in contention for the top ranking at the start of the tournament.

Seeds
The top four seeds received a bye into the second round.

Draw

Finals

Top half

Bottom half

References
 Main Draw

Women's Doubles